The Funny Side of Christmas is a Christmas special broadcast by BBC1 on 27 December 1982.

Presented by Frank Muir, it comprised one comedy sketch each from 10 contemporaneous BBC comedy series: Butterflies, The Fall and Rise of Reginald Perrin, Last of the Summer Wine, The Les Dawson Show, Only Fools and Horses, Open All Hours, Smith and Jones, Sorry!, Three of a Kind, and Yes Minister.

Comedy sketches

The sketches below are listed in the order in which they appear in the programme.

The Fall and Rise of Reginald Perrin
It's Christmas Day, and no sooner than Reggie has settled in to relax with his wife Elizabeth, they are inundated by entreating houseguests.

Written by David Nobbs.

Cast: Leonard Rossiter as Reggie Perrin, Pauline Yates as Elizabeth Perrin, Sue Nicholls as Joan Greengross, John Barron as CJ, Trevor Adams as Tony Webster, Bruce Bould as David Harris-Jones, John Horsley as Doc Morrissey, Geoffrey Palmer as Jimmy Anderson, and Michael Ripper as the tramp.

The Les Dawson Show
Cast: Les Dawson and Roy Barraclough as Cissie and Ada.

Directed by Ernest Maxin; produced by Robin Nash.

Yes Minister
Humphrey wishes the Minister a happy Christmas in civil servant style.

Written by Jonathan Lynn and Antony Jay; directed by Sydney Lotterby.

Cast: Nigel Hawthorne as Sir Humphrey Appleby, Paul Eddington as Jim Hacker, and Derek Fowlds as Bernard Woolley

Only Fools and Horses

"Christmas Trees" is the title of this vignette, in which Del Boy is determined to sell 149 telescopic Christmas trees. Maybe an endorsement from the Church of England would help?

"Christmas Trees" was written by John Sullivan, and directed and produced by Ray Butt.

Cast: David Jason as Derek Trotter, Nicholas Lyndhurst as Rodney Trotter, Lennard Pearce as Grandad Trotter, John Pennington as the vicar, and Roy Heather as Sid

Three of a Kind
Cast: Tracey Ullman, Lenny Henry, and David Copperfield

Last of the Summer Wine
Norman, Foggy, and Compo get together on Christmas Day, but Norman is determined to keep Christmas at bay.

Written by Roy Clarke; directed by Alan J. W. Bell.

Cast: Peter Sallis as Norman, Brian Wilde as Foggy, and Bill Owen as Compo

Sorry!
Written by Ian Davidson and Peter Vincent; directed by David Askey.

Cast: Ronnie Corbett as Timothy, Barbara Lott as Mother, and William Moore as Father

Butterflies
Christmas dinner is over, and Ria's sons are about to leave for a party. A desperate Leonard has been gazing at their house from his car. Later, he phones the house just as Ria and her husband Ben are kissing under the mistletoe.

Written by Carla Lane.

Cast: Wendy Craig as Ria, Geoffrey Palmer as Ben, Andrew Hall as Russell, Nicholas Lyndhurst as Adam, Bruce Montague as Leonard, and as Michael Ripper as Thomas

Smith and Jones
Written by Griff Rhys Jones and Mel Smith; directed by Martin Shardlow.

Cast: Mel Smith as Mr Mather, and Griff Rhys Jones as Trevor

Open All Hours
It is Christmas morning, and we learn that Granville and Arkwright are invited to Nurse Gladys' flat for dinner. Granville is looking forward to it, but Arkwright's anticipation is tempered by the knowledge that Gladys' mother will be there.

Written by Roy Clarke.

Cast: Ronnie Barker as Arkwright, David Jason as Granville, and Lynda Baron as Nurse Gladys Emmanuel

See also
 Christmas Night with the Stars
 List of Christmas television specials

References

External links
 Transcript of "Christmas Trees"
 

1982 television specials
1982 television films
1982 films
1982 British television episodes
British television specials
Christmas television specials
Only Fools and Horses special episodes
Last of the Summer Wine
Yes Minister episodes
BBC television comedy
Television episodes written by Antony Jay
Television episodes written by Jonathan Lynn